Erdoğan Aygan (born January 11, 1979) is a Turkish Paralympian archer competing in the Men's compound bow event.

Early life
Erdoğan Aygan was born on January 11, 1979. He lives in Istanbul, Turkey.

Sporting career
Aygan began his archery career in 2009, and debuted internationally in 2010. He has been coached by Metin Gazoz at Istanbul Archery Club since 2009.

He won a gold medal with the national mixed team  at the 2013 World Para-archery Championships in Bangkok, Thailand, and a silver medal with the men's team at the 2015 World Para Archery Championships in Donaueschingen, Germany.

He obtained a quota spot for the 2016 Summer Paralympics in Rio de Janeiro, Brazil.

References

1979 births
Turkish male archers
Paralympic archers of Turkey
Wheelchair category Paralympic competitors
Archers at the 2016 Summer Paralympics
Living people
Islamic Solidarity Games medalists in archery